Jorge Duílio Lima Menezes (born March 22, 1939) is a Brazilian popular musician, performing under the stage name Jorge Ben Jor since the 1980s, though commonly known by his former stage name Jorge Ben. His characteristic style fuses samba, funk, rock and bossa nova with lyrics that blend humor and satire with often esoteric subject matter. His hits include "Chove Chuva", "Mas, que Nada!", "Ive Brussel" and "Balança Pema", and have been interpreted by artists such as Caetano Veloso, Sérgio Mendes, Miriam Makeba, Soulfly and Marisa Monte.

Ben's broad-minded and original approach to samba led him through participation in some of Brazilian popular music's most important musical movements, such as bossa nova, Jovem Guarda, and Tropicália, with the latter period defined by his albums Jorge Ben (1969) and Fôrça Bruta (1970). He has been called "the father of samba rock", by Billboard magazine. According to American music critic Robert Christgau, Ben and his contemporary Gilberto Gil were "always ready to go further out on a beat than the other samba/bossa geniuses".

Biography

Early life and career
Born Jorge Duílio Lima Menezes in Rio de Janeiro, he first took the stage name Jorge Ben after his mother's name (Sílvia Saint Ben Lima, Brazilian-born of Ethiopian origin) but in the 1980s changed it to Jorge Ben Jor (commonly written Benjor).

Jorge Ben obtained his first pandeiro (Brazil's most popular type of tambourine) when he was thirteen, and two years later, was singing in a church choir. He also took part as a pandeiro player in the blocos of Carnaval, and from eighteen years of age, he began performing at parties and nightclubs with the guitar given to him by his mother. He was given the nickname "Babulina" after his enthusiastic pronunciation of rockabilly singer Ronnie Self's song "Bop-A-Lena". Was introduced to Tim Maia by Erasmo Carlos. It was in 1963 at one of those clubs in which he performed that Jorge's musical career took off; he came on stage and sang "Mas, que Nada!" to a small crowd that happened to include an executive from the recording company, Philips. One week later, Jorge Ben's first single was released.

The hybrid rhythms that Jorge employed brought him some problems at the start of his career, when Brazilian music was split between the rockier sounds of the Jovem Guarda and traditional samba with its complex lyrics. However, as that phase in Brazilian pop music history passed and bossa nova became better known throughout the world, Ben rose to prominence.

Holdings both television programs O Fino da Bossa and Jovem Guarda from Rede Record, after being reprimanded by the production of "O Fino da Bossa", chose to participate in the Jovem Guarda, soon after, joined the program Divino, Maravilhoso from TV Tupi, presented by Caetano Veloso and Gilberto Gil.

Jorge Ben's first public appearances were in small festivals organised by his friends, where bossa nova and rock and roll predominated. As with most musicians of the time, Ben was initially influenced by João Gilberto even though he was quite innovative in his own right. The aforementioned song, "Mas, que Nada!", was his first big hit in Brazil, and remains to this day the most played song in the United States sung entirely in Portuguese. Outside of Brazil, the song is better known in cover versions by Sérgio Mendes and the Tamba Trio. The song has also been reinterpreted by prominent jazz artists including Ella Fitzgerald, Oscar Peterson, Dizzy Gillespie and Al Jarreau; as well as other samba artists of the time, such as Elza Soares.

His musical work has been vastly sampled by music producers and DJs, and covered by many bands in a variety of genres such as heavy metal, disco, rock, reggae, jazz, drum and bass, house music and more.

Ben's 1963 debut album Samba Esquema Novo was met with great acclaim from fans, and encouraged Philips to capitalize on the success with immediate follow-up albums. The label pressured Ben to hastily record songs imitative of his debut, along with cover songs, resulting in the three albums within the span of 18 months and a strain on the singer's relationship with Philips. He left the label after his 1965 album Big Ben.

Success
In 1969, Jorge Ben released his eponymous album amid the excitement of the cultural and musical Tropicália movement. The album featured Trio Mocotó as his backing band, who would go on to launch a successful career on the back of their association with Ben. The album was noted for "País Tropical", one of his most famous compositions, although it would be Wilson Simonal who would take his recording of the song to the top of the charts in Brazil that same year. Instead, the song "Charles, Anjo 45", also from the self-titled album, would become Ben's biggest self-performed chart hit of the year.

Jorge Ben released his most esoteric and experimental albums in the 1970s, most notably A Tábua de Esmeralda in 1974 and Solta o Pavão in 1975. The following year he released one of his most popular albums, África Brasil, a fusion of funk and samba which relied more on the electric guitar than previous efforts. This album also features a remake of his previously released song "Taj Mahal." With its commercial success and sustained radio play, the melody made its way into the 1979 hit "Da Ya Think I'm Sexy?" by Rod Stewart. Ben sued for plagiarism and Stewart settled the lawsuit and donated the single’s royalties to UNICEF. 

In 1989, Jorge changed his recording label as well as his artistic name, becoming Jorge Benjor (or Jorge Ben Jor). At the time, it was said that there were numerological reasons for his change in name; other sources say it was in response to an incident where some of his royalties accidentally went to American guitarist George Benson.

Recent career

In 2002, Jorge Ben contributed to the critically acclaimed Red Hot + Riot, a compilation CD created by the Red Hot Organization in tribute to the music and work of Nigerian musician Fela Kuti, which raised money for various charities devoted to raising AIDS awareness and fighting the disease. He collaborated with fellow hip-hop artists Dead Prez, Talib Kweli, and Bilal to remake Fela Kuti's famous song "Shuffering and Shmiling" for the CD.

Ben was presented with the Lifetime Achievement Award by the Latin Recording Academy in 2005. A year later, a remake of Ben's "Mas, que Nada!" became an international chart hit for Sérgio Mendes with The Black Eyed Peas after being used by Nike in a global TV advertisement during the 2006 FIFA World Cup; this remake (the second time Mendes had covered the track) reached the Top 10 in several European countries, including the UK and Germany, in addition to reaching Number 1 in the Netherlands.

Jorge Ben is also a big fan of Flamengo, a Brazilian football club, located in Rio de Janeiro, which counts Zico, Junior and Leandro among their former star players. Ben's interest in football carries over to his music, as many of his songs deal with the subject, such as "Flamengo", "Camisa 10 da Gávea", "Ponta De Lança Africano (Umbabarauma)", "Zagueiro", "Fio Maravilha", and "A Loba Comeu o Canário".

On July 7, 2007, he performed at the Brazilian leg of Live Earth in Rio de Janeiro.

Discography
1963: Samba Esquema Novo
1964: Ben é Samba Bom
1964: Sacundin Ben Samba
1965: Big Ben
1967: O Bidú: Silêncio no Brooklin
1969: Jorge Ben
1970: Fôrça Bruta
1971: Negro é Lindo
1972: Ben
1973: 10 Anos Depois
1974: A Tábua de Esmeralda
1975: Solta o Pavão
1975: à l'Olympia
1975: Gil e Jorge (with Gilberto Gil)
1976: África Brasil
1976: Samba Nova
1977: Tropical
1978: A Banda Do Zé Pretinho
1979: Salve Simpatia
1980: Alô, Alô, Como Vai?
1981: Bem Vinda Amizade
1983: Dadiva
1984: Sonsual
1986: Ben Brasil
1989: Ben Jor
1992: Live in Rio
1994: 23
1995: Homo sapiens
1997: Musicas Para Tocar Em Elevador
2000: Puro Suingue
2002: Acústico MTV – Double CD release, available jointly or separately, consisting of Admiral Jorge V and Banda do Zé Pretinho
2004: Reactivus Amor Est (Turba Philosophorum)
2006: Sou da Pesada (7 Samurai Afroraduno Remix)/A Joven Samba *(Klasick Remix)
2007: Recuerdos de Assunción 443
2008: Favourites: From Samba Esquema Novo 1963 – África Brasil 1976

References

Further reading

External links
Official Site
'Brazil's alchemist of funk' – 2004 interview with Jorge Ben Jor (in English)
1996 interview with Jorge Ben Jor from Brazilian Music Up to Date (in English and Portuguese)
Jorge Ben discography on Slipcue.com
Jorge Ben profiled by Bobby Brazuka
Remarks by the President to the People of Brazil in Rio de Janeiro, Brazil

1942 births
Living people
Afro-Brazilian male songer-songwriters
Afro-Brazilian composers
20th-century Brazilian male singers
20th-century Brazilian singers
Latin Grammy Lifetime Achievement Award winners
Brazilian guitarists
Bossa nova guitarists
Latin music songwriters
Brazilian male guitarists
Música Popular Brasileira singers
Samba musicians
Wrasse Records artists
Island Records artists
Brazilian people of Ethiopian descent
Musicians from Rio de Janeiro (city)
20th-century composers
21st-century composers
20th-century guitarists
21st-century guitarists
21st-century Brazilian male singers
21st-century Brazilian singers
Male jazz musicians